Cross Timbers State Park is a state park in Woodson County, Kansas, United States.  It is located immediately south of Toronto.

The park is settled within the hills of Verdigris River valley in southeast Kansas. Comprising  in the northern region known to early pioneers as the Cross Timbers, the park is adjacent  Toronto Wildlife Area and has numerous access points to the  Toronto Lake.

This region was a favored hunting and camping ground of Native Americans of the Osage Nation. The forested flood plains are surrounded by terraces of prairie and hills of oak savanna.

Fishing in the river offers anglers an excellent chance at white crappie, white bass, channel catfish, and flathead catfish, black bass, bluegill, and  sunfish. Species common to the area included white-tailed deer, wild turkey, quail, squirrel, rabbit, dove, and raccoon. The rich variety of songbirds appeal to wildlife observers and photographers.

See also
 List of Kansas state parks
 List of lakes, reservoirs, and dams in Kansas
 List of rivers of Kansas

References

External links

State parks of Kansas
Protected areas of Woodson County, Kansas